The girls' singles tournament of the 2016 Badminton Asia Junior Championships was held from July 13–17 at the CPB Badminton and Sports Science Training Center, Bangkok. The defending champions of the last edition is He Bingjiao from China. Pornpawee Chochuwong, Goh Jin Wei and Chen Yufei were the top 3 seeded this year. Chen Yufei of China emerged as the champion after defeat Gregoria Mariska of Indonesia in the finals with the score 25–23, 21–14.

Seeded

  Pornpawee Chochuwong (quarter final)
  Goh Jin Wei (quarter final)
  Chen Yufei (champion)
  Gregoria Mariska (final)
  Natsuki Nidaira (quarter final)
  Kim Ga-eun (semi final)
  Gao Fangjie (semi final)
  Pattarasuda Chaiwan (quarter final)

Draw

Finals

Top half

Section 1

Section 2

Section 3

Section 4

Bottom half

Section 5

Section 6

Section 7

Section 8

References

External links 
Main Draw

2016 Badminton Asia Junior Championships
Junior